Pavel Bezdek (born 1965) is a Czech actor and stunt performer. He has had minor roles in a handful of well-known action movies, as well as being a stunt coordinator in others. He usually takes work for sequences filmed at sets in Prague, a popular filming location. Bezdek is also currently a member of the Czech-based Filmka stunt team.

Notable roles

As actor
Kamarád do deste II - Príbeh z Brooklynu (1992)
Escape Velocity (1999) - Lars (escaped con)
Deadly Engagement (2002) - Gate Guard
The League of Extraordinary Gentlemen (2003) - Marksman #1
Alien vs. Predator (2004) - Bass
Hannibal Rising (2007) - Dieter
Czech-Made Man (2011) - Stamgast
Mission: Impossible – Ghost Protocol (2011) - Prison Guard
Vsivaci (2014)
Last Knights (2015) - Goon (uncredited)
Gangster Ka (2015) - Únosce
Celebrity S.R.O. (2015) - Sergej
Strasidla (2016) - Mastný

As stunt performer
Black Hawk Down (2001)
Frank Herbert's Dune (2000)
Frank Herbert's Children of Dune (2003)
Hellboy (2004)
Van Helsing (2004)

External links 

 Filmka Stunts website

1965 births
Czech male film actors
Living people
Czech stunt performers